Abdel Aziz Zaibi (born 15 April 1953) is a Tunisian handball player. He competed in the men's tournament at the 1972 Summer Olympics.

References

1953 births
Living people
Tunisian male handball players
Olympic handball players of Tunisia
Handball players at the 1972 Summer Olympics
Place of birth missing (living people)